Michael Blackwood may refer to:

 Michael Blackwood (filmmaker) (born 1934), American filmmaker
 Michael Blackwood (footballer) (born 1979), English footballer 
 Michael Blackwood (sprinter) (born 1976), Jamaican track and field athlete
 Michael Hill Blackwood (1917–2005), British lawyer and politician in Nyasaland and Malawi